Florence "Flea" Anna Marie St George (née Brudenell-Bruce; born 21 November 1985) is an English model and former actress.

The daughter of Andrew Brudenell-Bruce, a wine merchant and descendant of Ernest Brudenell-Bruce, 3rd Marquess of Ailesbury, 9th Earl of Cardigan; and French artist Sophie Brudenell-Bruce, she has three elder siblings: a brother, Henry, and two sisters, Alice and Christabel, the latter married with two daughters.

Brudenell-Bruce grew up in Fulham. Educated at Woldingham and then Stowe School, she went on to graduate from the University of Bristol with a degree in the History of Art.

In July 2013, she married Henry Edward Hugh St George, grandson of the Marchese di San Giorgio and maternal grandson of the 11th Duke of Grafton. In March 2014, it was revealed that the couple were expecting their first child later that year. Their daughter, Iris Lara St George, was born on 22 July 2014.

Brudenell-Bruce starred as Sydney in Robocroc via Syfy movie.

Florence also has an acting credit for the role of Amy Catz in the TV detective series Lewis. The episode "The Mind has Mountains" aired in 2011 in series 5 alongside Thomas Brodie-Sangster.

She began working with ceramics after she experienced post-natal depression. She appeared as a contestant on The Great Pottery Throw Down in 2020 and was the fifth potter to be eliminated.

Filmography

References

External links
 Florence Brudenell-Bruce art consultancy
 Florence Brudenell-Bruce at the Internet Movie Database
 Florence Brudenell-Bruce at Vogue
 Florence Brudenell-Bruce at Tess Management
 
 Florence Brudenell-Bruce at FHM

1985 births
Living people
People from Fulham
English female models
English film actresses
Florence
English people of French descent
People educated at Woldingham School
People educated at Stowe School
Alumni of the University of Bristol
English expatriates in India
Actresses in Hindi cinema
British expatriate actresses in India
European actresses in India
Actresses of European descent in Indian films
21st-century English women
21st-century English actresses
21st-century British actresses